Thomas Morten (1836–1866) was an English painter and book illustrator.

Life 
Thomas Morten was born on 27 March 1836 at Uxbridge, Middlesex. He came to London and studied at the painting school kept by J. Mathews Leigh in Newman Street. Morten was chiefly employed as an illustrator of books and serials, mostly of a humorous nature. The most successful were his illustrations to an edition of Swift's Gulliver's Travels, published in 1864, which ran into several editions. Morten also practised as a painter of domestic subjects, and was an occasional exhibitor at the Royal Academy, sending in 1866 Pleading for the Prisoner. His affairs, however, became embarrassed, and he committed suicide on 23 September 1866.

Gallery

References

Sources 

 
 Cooke, Simon (21 March 2013). "Thomas Morten (1836-66)". Victorian Web. Retrieved 21 September 2022.
 
 Graves, Algernon (1884). A Dictionary of Artists Who Have Exhibited Works in the Principal London Exhibitions of Oil Paintings From 1760 to 1880. London: George Bell and Sons. p. 165.
 Redgrave, Samuel (1874). "Morten, Thomas". A Dictionary of Artists of the English School. London: Longmans, Green, and Co. p. 284.
 "Morten, Thomas". Benezit Dictionary of Artists. Oxford Art Online. 2011. Retrieved 21 September 2022.

External links 

 "Morten, Thomas, 1836-1866". Online Books Page. Retrieved 21 September 2022.
 "Thomas Morten (1836-1866)". Royal Academy. Retrieved 21 September 2022.
 "Thomas Morten". British Museum. Retrieved 21 September 2022.

1836 births
1866 deaths
19th-century English painters
English illustrators
Suicides in England
1860s suicides